Darren Holmes (born 3 September 1970) is a former Australian rules footballer who played with the Sydney Swans and Fitzroy in the Australian Football League (AFL) during the 1990s.

A utility, Holmes had his most productive year in 1992 when he made 19 appearances and after two more seasons was traded to Fitzroy. He was a member of the last Fitzroy squad, playing seven games in the 1996 AFL season.

Holmes had the misfortune of playing in five consecutive wooden spoon sides, with Sydney from 1992 to 1994 and then at Fitzroy in the next two seasons. Overall, of the 63 career games he played, he was on the victorious side just ten times.

Holmes was the man who tackled the piglet which had been set loose during a game against St Kilda at the Sydney Cricket Ground in 1993.

References

1970 births
Living people
Australian rules footballers from New South Wales
Sydney Swans players
Fitzroy Football Club players
Lavington Football Club players
New South Wales Australian rules football State of Origin players